Šumice is a municipality and village in Uherské Hradiště District in the Zlín Region of the Czech Republic. It has about 1,600 inhabitants.

Geography
It lies in the Vizovice Highlands, on the Olšava River.

History
The first written mention of Šumice is from 1380.

Notable people
Jiří Bárta (1935–2012), pianist and composer

References

Villages in Uherské Hradiště District
Moravian Slovakia